Anton Dolin may refer to:

 Anton Dolin (ballet dancer) (1904–1983), English ballet dancer and choreographer
 Anton Vladimirovich Dolin (born 1976), Russian film critic and journalist